The 17th Los Angeles Film Critics Association Awards were announced on 14 December 1991 and given on 21 January 1992.

Winners
Best Picture:
Bugsy
Runner-up: The Fisher King
Best Director:
Barry Levinson – Bugsy
Runner-up: Terry Gilliam – The Fisher King
Best Actor:
Nick Nolte – The Prince of Tides
Runner-up: Warren Beatty – Bugsy
Best Actress:
Mercedes Ruehl – The Fisher King
Runner-up: Jodie Foster – The Silence of the Lambs
Best Supporting Actor:
Michael Lerner – Barton Fink
Runner-up: Robert Duvall – Rambling Rose
Best Supporting Actress:
Jane Horrocks – Life Is Sweet
Runner-up: Amanda Plummer – The Fisher King
Best Screenplay:
James Toback – Bugsy
Runner-up: Richard LaGravenese – The Fisher King
Best Cinematography:
Roger Deakins – Barton Fink and Homicide
Runner-up: John J. Campbell and Eric Alan Edwards – My Own Private Idaho
Best Music Score:
Zbigniew Preisner – The Double Life of Veronique (La double vie de Véronique), At Play in the Fields of the Lord and Europa Europa
Runner-up: Howard Shore – The Silence of the Lambs and Naked Lunch
Best Foreign Film:
La Belle Noiseuse • France/Switzerland
Runner-up: Europa Europa • Germany/France/Poland
Best Non-Fiction Film:
American Dream
Best Animation:
Beauty and the Beast
Experimental/Independent Film/Video Award:
Jon Jost – All the Vermeers in New York
New Generation Award:
John Singleton – Boyz n the Hood
Career Achievement Award (tie):
Elmer Bernstein
Vincent Price
Special Citation:
The National Film Board of Canada on the 50th anniversary of its animation unit.

References

External links
17th Annual Los Angeles Film Critics Association Awards

1991
Los Angeles Film Critics Association Awards
Los Angeles Film Critics Association Awards
Los Angeles Film Critics Association Awards
Los Angeles Film Critics Association Awards